Bravia can refer to:
 Bravia (automobile), a Portuguese vehicle manufacturer
 Bravia Chaimite, a Portuguese armored vehicle
 Bravia (brand), a range of televisions from Sony
 Bryansk Air Enterprise, an airline also known as Bravia